Eric James Knott (born September 23, 1974) is an American former professional baseball pitcher who played Major League Baseball for two seasons. He pitched for the Arizona Diamondbacks in 2001 and the Montreal Expos in 2003, playing in 16 career games.

Knott attended Florida Southwestern State College and Stetson University, and in 1994 he played collegiate summer baseball with the Harwich Mariners of the Cape Cod Baseball League. He was selected by the Diamondbacks in the 24th round of the 1996 MLB Draft.

References

External links

1974 births
Living people
American expatriate baseball players in Canada
American expatriate baseball players in Japan
American expatriate baseball players in Mexico
Arizona Diamondbacks players
Baseball players from Illinois
Chiba Lotte Marines players
Edmonton Trappers players
El Paso Diablos players
Harwich Mariners players
High Desert Mavericks players
Las Vegas 51s players
Lethbridge Black Diamonds players
Major League Baseball pitchers
Mexican League baseball pitchers
Montreal Expos players
Naranjeros de Hermosillo players
Nippon Professional Baseball pitchers
Oklahoma RedHawks players
Pericos de Puebla players
Stetson Hatters baseball players
Tucson Sidewinders players
Florida SouthWestern Buccaneers baseball players